The Lal Begi, or Lalbegi, are a Chuhra caste found in the states of Bihar and Uttar Pradesh in India, as well as in Multan, Dera Ghazi Khan and Bahawalpur in Pakistan. The Muslim branch of the Lal Begi are known as Hasnati and the Hindu branch as Kayastha (sometime) or Balmiki which are different from Kayastha community who also uses it as there surname.

History and origin
According to their traditions, they are followers of Mehtar Ilyas. The Mehtar took to sweeping as an occupation, after he was summoned to the heavens, where a meeting of prophets was occurring. He wanted to spit, but was unable to find a spittoon, so spat upwards. The spit fell on the prophets, and God as a punishment made him sweep the spit. His descendants were cursed to live their life as sweepers. The Mehtar was one day approached by a Sufi saint, who asked him why he did not wear a coat. The Mehtar replied, that as a sweeper, he did not need a coat. The saint commanded that he wear a coat, and the Mehtar went to an open a pitcher, but was unable to do so. So the saint said, use my name, and you will be open the pitcher. And out of the pitcher came a young boy, who was named Lal Beg. The community claim descent from this boy.

In Bihar, the Lal Begi claim descent from the saint Balmiki, and originated in Rajasthan. They are distributed in the urban centres of Jharia, Dhanbad, Sindri, Katras and Chas.in Pakistan this nation is famous for his work.

Present circumstances
The Lal Beg have been sweepers and scavenger, both activities considered as polluting. As such, they have been an extremely marginalized community. Many members of the community work as sweepers for the municipal authorities and hospitals.

The community has undergone a major split. A section of the Lal Beg have embraced Hinduism, and now are known as Balmiki. As Balmiki, they have obtained Scheduled Caste status. The exact  religious status of the community remains in a flux, with some members taking Hindu names to obtain the advantage of Scheduled Caste status.  Most Lal Begi have remained Muslim. They have also set up a caste association, the Hasnati Biradari.

In Bihar, the community consists of a number clans such as the Bhiwal, Pandit and Chamria. They are employed by the municipal authorities as sweepers. A small number are now employed as daily wage labourers. The community now comprises Hindu and Muslim sections, and boundaries between the two groups is hardening. In past, the groups intermarried, but this is no longer the case. They speak the various local dialects of Hindi, with very few having any knowledge of Urdu.

The Lal Begi Scheduled Caste population in Uttar Pradesh at the 2011 Census of India was 560.

See also
Halalkhor
Pasmanda Muslim Mahaz

References

Dalit Muslim
Scheduled Castes of Uttar Pradesh
Muslim communities of Uttar Pradesh
Social groups of Bihar